Enfield Town Park is a 9.5-hectare park in the Enfield Town area of the London Borough of Enfield, first opened in 1902. The New River is present at the park but it has been cut off and straightened leaving the water motionless.

References

See also 
 Enfield Old Park

1902 establishments in the United Kingdom
Parks and open spaces in the London Borough of Enfield
Enfield, London